The flag of the Andes was a flag used by Argentine patriot José de San Martín and his Army of the Andes during their famous Crossing of the Andes and their subsequent military campaigns to Chile and Peru. The flag of the Andes was personally designed by San Martín and sewn by ladies from the Cuyo region and wives of San Martín's officers. It includes a proto-coat of arms of Argentina placed horizontally over a sky-blue and white bicolor background.

Legacy
The same design used in the flag of the Andes is used by the provincial government of Mendoza Province as their official flag.

Andes
José de San Martín
Argentine War of Independence
Mendoza Province